Seja Vogel (pronounced say-ah) (born 21 May 1981) is a German-Australian musician who was a member of Brisbane bands Sekiden and Regurgitator.

Early life
Vogel was born on 21 May 1981 in Kassel, West Germany. She grew up in Stuttgart before moving to Australia with her family when she was seven years old. She attended a Steiner School and often credits her creativity to her early Steiner Education. Vogel learnt violin and piano at an early age, and became interested in synthesizers after hearing bands like The Cars, Devo and Kraftwerk in high school.

Musical career
Formed in 1998, Sekiden released two albums and two EPs. The band was known for high-energy live performances and they toured extensively throughout Australia, Canada, Japan and the USA, touring with bands such as the Zoobombs. Sekiden released music through Modular Records, Australian independent labels Redline Records and Valve, Japanese label Bad News, and the American Boompa! label.

Vogel joined iconic genre-mashers Regurgitator in 2007 as a touring member and also contributed to their studio album Love and Paranoia that was recorded in Brazil. Vogel also played in the backing bands of Spod, Heinz Reigler, Ben Salter and David McCormack.

Vogel later recorded and performed under her own name for the album We Have Secrets But Nobody Cares, released through Sydney record label Rice Is Nice on 27 March 2010. Vogel toured widely following the release of the album and supported acts such as Sarah Blasko, Goldfrapp and Warpaint.

In between touring and recording, Vogel started a textile label named 'Pul(sew)idth' that produces miniature felt replicas of instruments made by Vogel herself.
Alongside her own music, she is currently writing a rap album with Quan Yeomans of Regurgitator.

Podcast
At the end of 2016, Seja started her podcast HearSej where she talks to musicians and other creatives about their careers in a casual and intimate conversation. Some guests include Kevin Mitchell of Jebediah, Sarah Blasko, Megan Washington and Benjamin Law.

Discography
We Have Secrets But Nobody Cares (2010) – Rice Is Nice
All Our Wires (2013) – Rice Is Nice

References

1981 births
Living people
Australian songwriters
Australian rock singers
Australian rock keyboardists
German emigrants to Australia
Musicians from Stuttgart
Australian people of German descent
German expatriates in Australia